Orion Telescopes & Binoculars is an American retail company that sells telescopes, binoculars and accessories online and in-store for astronomy and birdwatching. It was founded in 1975 and has corporate offices in Watsonville, California. A large proportion of its products are manufactured by the Chinese company Synta for the Orion brand name. Orion Telescopes & Binoculars ships its products to the United States and over 20 other countries. Orion puts out a semi-quarterly mail-order catalog as well as email catalogs. The company is a prominent advertiser in North American astronomy magazines, such as Sky & Telescope and Astronomy.

History
In 1975, Orion Telescopes & Binoculars was founded in a garage in Santa Cruz, California by Tim Gieseler, who served as its only president and CEO.

Between the mid-1990s and 2005, Orion only sold binoculars, telescopes, and accessories under the "Orion" brand.

In January 2005, Orion was acquired by Imaginova, the U.S. conglomerate founded in 1999 by CNN business anchor Lou Dobbs. Orion then began to sell non-Orion brand products, such as Tele Vue eyepieces and even Celestron  and  Schmidt-Cassegrain telescopes.

In November 2017, Orion was repurchased by its employees, and has remained independent and American-owned ever since.

In June 2021, Orion acquired Meade Instruments

Products

Orion sells a range of telescopes that they characterize as "beginner", "intermediate" or "advanced", including Newtonians, Maksutovs, Schmidt-Cassegrains, Ritchey-Chrétiens and refractors with or without (sold as optical tube assemblies or "OTA") a variety of mounts. Orion also sells a series of Dobsonian telescopes that come in "Classic" and "IntelliScope" versions, the latter with upgraded accessories and the ability to indicate astronomical objects to the observer aided by a computerized object database. Orion also sells Dobsonians with GoTo and tracking capabilities.

In late 2005 Celestron (which had recently been purchased by Synta Technology Corporation of Taiwan) announced an agreement that would allow Celestron 8, 9.25, and  Schmidt-Cassegrain optical tube assemblies (OTA), painted in metallic gray and using the "Orion" brand (Celestron OTAs are painted either gloss black or semi-gloss matte orange), to be sold with Orion branded German equatorial mounts (also made by Synta) and eyepiece accessories.

At the high performance end of their range, Orion has a series of two element apochromatic (apo) refractors manufactured by Synta featuring "extra low dispersion" fluorite crown glass in one element of the objective lens.

Orion also sells binoculars for astronomical and terrestrial observing, microscopes and monocular spotting scopes of the type used by birdwatchers and marksmen.

References

External links
 
 Company7 Orion Telescopes & Binoculars resource page

{{|url=http://www.sfsidewalkastronomers.org/index.php?page=sf-bay-area-telescope-stores |publisher=San Francisco Sidewalk Astronomers |title=SF Bay Area Telescope Stores - Orion Telescopes & Binoculars}}

Telescope manufacturers
Retail companies of the United States
Manufacturing companies established in 1975
Retail companies established in 1975
1975 establishments in California